Emo (originally short for "emotional hardcore" or "emocore") is a subculture and a style of rock music.

Emo may also refer to:

Businesses 

 Emo (oil), an Irish oil company and filling station chain
 Emo Speedway, a racetrack in Emo, Ontario
 Emo's, a nightclub in Austin, Texas 
 Educational Management Organization or for-profit school
 Chamber of Electrical Engineers of Turkey, established in 1954

Music 
 Emo (album), an album by Screeching Weasel
 Emo, an album by Sari Kaasinen
 "Emo", a song by Blink-182 from the band's album Dude Ranch

Places 
 Emo, County Laois, a village in Ireland
 Emo Court, a mansion in County Laois, Ireland
 Emo, Ontario, a town in Canada
 Villa Emo, a villa in Italy
 East Moriches, a town on Long Island.

People
 Emo (name)
 E-Mo, a character in the U.S. TV series A Gifted Man
 A character in the 3D animated short film Elephants Dream
 Uncle Emo, a character in Story Teller (magazine)

Other 
 EMO (trade show), an international metal-working industry trade show held in Europe
 Extra man offense in field lacrosse
 Emergency Management Office, also referred to as an "Office of Emergency Management"

See also

Emo Park, a city park in Adelaide, South Australia
Eno (disambiguation)